Lessard may refer to:

People
 Alton A. Lessard (1909–1976), American politician
 Bob Lessard (born 1931), American politician
 Evelyn Lessard, American biological oceanographer
 Francis Lessard (born 1979), Canadian ice hockey player
 François-Louis Lessard (1860–1927), Canadian general
 Laurent Lessard (born 1962), Canadian politician
 Lucien Lessard (born 1938), Canadian politician
 Lucille Lessard (born 1957), Canadian archer
 Jean Lessard (1932–2013), Canadian alpine skier
 John Lessard (1920–2003), American composer
 Joseph Lessard (1847–1914), Canadian politician
 Junior Lessard (born 1980), Canadian ice hockey player 
 Marcel Lessard (born 1926), Canadian politician
 Marie-Andrée Lessard (born 1977), Canadian beach volleyball player
 Marie-Évelyne Lessard, Canadian actress
 Mario Lessard (born 1954), Canadian ice hockey player
 Prosper-Edmond Lessard (1873–1931), Canadian politician
 Raphaël Lessard (born 2001), Canadian racecar driver
 Raymond W. Lessard (1930–2016), American Catholic bishop
 Rick Lessard (born 1968), Canadian ice hockey player
 Stefan Lessard (born 1974), American musician
 Stéphane Lessard (born 1962), French ice hockey player
 Suzannah Lessard (born 1944), American writer
 Wayne Lessard (born 1956), Canadian politician
 Yves Lessard (born 1943), Canadian politician

Places
 Lessard-et-le-Chêne, a French municipality in Calvados department
 Lessard-le-National, a French municipality in Saône-et-Loire department
 Lessard-en-Bresse, a French municipality in Saône-et-Loire department

See also

 Lessard River (disambiguation)